Mastax albonotata is a species of beetle in the family Carabidae found in South Africa.

References

Mastaxalbonotata
Beetles described in 1885
Beetles of Africa